Asylum was a comic book anthology series published by Image Comics co-founder Rob Liefeld's Maximum Press imprint, and featured several stories in each issue, including Tales of the Beanworld, Avengelyne and others.  It ran for eleven issues in the late 1990s.

References
Asylum @ comicbookdb

Maximum Press titles